Actopan is the name of several geographical objects in Mexico:

 Actopan, Hidalgo, a city in Hidalgo, central-eastern Mexico
 Actopan, Veracruz, a city in Veracruz, southern Mexico
 Actopan Municipality, Hidalgo, in Hidalgo, central-eastern Mexico
 Actopan Municipality, Veracruz, in Veracruz, southern Mexico
 Actopan River